Colburn is an unincorporated community in Bonner County, Idaho, United States. Colburn has a post office with ZIP code 83865.

History
Colburn's population was 50 in 1960.

References

Unincorporated communities in Bonner County, Idaho
Unincorporated communities in Idaho